Yuen Long Centre is one of the 39 constituencies in the Yuen Long District of Hong Kong. This constituency was named "Tai Kiu" before 2007 District Council election.

The constituency returns one district councillor to the Yuen Long District Council, with an election every four years. Yuen Long Centre constituency is loosely based on Chek Wing Court, Cheong Yu Building, Chun Chu House, Fook On Building, Ho Shun Fuk Building, Hop Yick Plaza, Kui Fat Building, Kwong Wah Centre and Opulence Height in Yuen Long with estimated population of 15,542.

Councillors represented

Election results

2010s

2000s

1990s

References

Yuen Long
Constituencies of Hong Kong
Constituencies of Yuen Long District Council
2007 establishments in Hong Kong
Constituencies established in 2007